Xenos are an Australian Romani music ensemble with a flexible roster of three to five core members and an extended line-up. They were formed in Zürich, Switzerland in 1989 playing Macedonian Roma music and relocated to south-eastern Australia in 1995.

Their third album, Tutti Frutti, was nominated at the 2001 ARIA Awards in the category, Best World Music Album.

Members 

 Rob Bester – fretless electric bass, davul, bagpipes
 Anne Hildyard – lead vocals, saxophone, gajda, zurna, clarinet 
 Sabine Bester - lead vocals, trumpet, baritone 
 Dave McNamara - trumpet, keys
 Dave Birch - baritone 
 Oliver Platt - sousaphone

 PAST MEMBERS
 Lee Hildyard – vocals
 Alister Price – piano accordion
 Matt De Boer – clarinet, kaval
 Josh Dunn –  guitar
 Will Eager – drums
 Philip Griffin – guitar, lauto 
 Greg Sheehan – drums
 Fuat Sazimanoski – drums
 Michael Karamitsos – drums
 Tunji Beier – drums
 Stephanos Elefteriadis – kemençe, drums
 Sophie Chapman – piano accordion
 Andy Busuttil –drums
 Christian Fotsch – bouzouki 
 Marem Aliev – sax, clarinet 
 Tahir Arsimov – drums
 Blair Greenberg – drums

Discography

Albums

Awards and nominations

ARIA Music Awards
The ARIA Music Awards is an annual awards ceremony that recognises excellence, innovation, and achievement across all genres of Australian music. They commenced in 1987.

! 
|-
| 2001
| Tutti Frutti
| ARIA Award for Best World Music Album
| 
| 
|-

References

External links

Australian world music groups
Musical groups established in 1989